Coscinia libyssa is a moth of the family Erebidae. It was described by Rudolf Püngeler in 1907. It is found on Sicily and in Algeria.

The wingspan is about 25 mm.

Subspecies
Coscinia lybissa lybissa (Algeria)
Coscinia lybissa caligans Turati, 1907 (Sicily)

References

Callimorphina
Moths described in 1907
Moths of Europe